Belopolskiy is a lunar impact crater that is located on the far side of the Moon. It lies to the west of the crater Houzeau, and northeast of Strömgren. Just to the northwest of Belopolskiy is the crater Ioffe.

The rim of Belopolskiy is somewhat eroded, particularly at the southern end where several small craterlets have worn away the rim edge. There is a slight intrusion in the northwestern rim where the ground has been modified by neighbouring Ioffe. The crater interior is relatively level, and marked with several tiny craterlets.

See also 
 1004 Belopolskya

References 

 
 
 
 
 
 
 
 
 
 
 
 

Impact craters on the Moon